Carl Lackey is an American ice hockey coach and former defenseman who was an All-American for Michigan State

Career
Lackey was captain of the Sault team that won the state ice hockey championship and national junior championship in 1957. He began attending Michigan State University in the fall of 1960 and joined the varsity squad the following year. The Spartans weren't very good during Lackey's three years, finishing 4th, 5th and 7th (last) in the WCHA. Lackey, however, was one of the few bright spots on the team and was named team captain for his senior season. Despite MSU winning just 1 of 14 league games that year, Lackey was named to the All-WCHA Second Team and was selected as an All-American.

After graduating, he played a year of professional hockey with the Toledo Blades and then spent almost a decape playing senior hockey in the USHL. He played for the US national team at the 1969 Ice Hockey World Championships that lost all 10 games and saw the club demoted to Group B. Five years later, Lackey made a second appearance for the national team, helping the team go undefeated in Group B and return to the top bracket.

Lackey retired as a player after the 1974 season and turned to coaching. He remained in the Green Bay area and worked as a guidance counselor while coaching youth hockey. Beginning in 2004, the Green Bay Gamblers have listed Lackey as an honorary coach for his contributions to hockey in the area. He was inducted into the Upper Peninsula Sports Hall of Fame in 2006.

Career statistics

Regular season and playoffs

International

Awards and honors

References

External links

1942 births
American men's ice hockey defensemen
Ice hockey players from Michigan
People from Sault Ste. Marie, Michigan
Michigan Tech Huskies men's ice hockey players
Toledo Blades players
Marquette Iron Rangers players
Green Bay Bobcats players
AHCA Division I men's ice hockey All-Americans
Ice hockey coaches from Michigan
Living people